Dil Diyaan Gallaan also known as Dil Diyaan Gallaan – Dil Ki Baatein is an Indian television drama series. Produced by Rashmi Sharma Telefilms, it stars Kaveri Priyam and Paras Arora. It premiered on 12 December 2022 on Sony SAB, and streams digitally on SonyLIV.

The story follows the misunderstanding occured between a family which seprates them and the conflict reached to their next generation, which constantly tries to reunite the family. But, their ego always seprated them, yet, they all loved each other.

Overview 
Story mainly revolves around Brar family, a Sikh family from Hoshiarpur, Punjab. The family lives in a small rural village, Lona Pind. Dilpreet Singh Brar, has two sons– Mandeep "Maan" Brar and Randeep "Rana" Brar. Dilpreet had a long desire to send his elder son Mandeep, to send America and make him doctor and then, opens a hospital named "Maan Hospital" in the village. Dilpreet took loan from moneylender and sends Maan to America and promised Khushwant, that Maan will marry his sister Prabhjot after returning from America.

But, Dilpreet's all desires shattered when Maan, returned from America after a long time married to Aastha, a Gujrati doctor. This made Khushwant angry and creates a deep enmity with Dilpreet. Khushwant, than tries to snatch away Dilpreet's land on which the hospital had to be built. 

When Randeep expressed his desire to also visit to America, Dilpreet rudely tears his scholarship papers. This creates a conflict between Randeep and Dilpreet, and thus, Randeep leaves Dilpreet too and moved to Delhi. 

25 years later, their next generation, Amrita Barar, the daughter of Mandeep and Aastha, Riya Barar, the daughter of Randeep and Nimrit and Veer Malhotra, the adopted son of Dilpreet and Sanjot Barar unites to solve all disputes between the family. But, their emotional weakness, love and conspiracies of Khushwant constantly tries to make their relationship more troubled. Situation become worse, when Riya and Amrita have constant odds and in between Veer proposes Amrita, unknown from the fact, that Riya already had crush on him. 

Their misunderstanding, arrogance, emotional development and constant odds but silent and hidden love for each other is the central theme of the drama.

Cast

Main 
 Kaveri Priyam as Amrita "Amu" Kaur Brar - Aastha and Mandeep's daughter; Riya's elder cousin sister; Randeep and Nimrit's niece; Veer's love Interest; Dilpreet and Sanjot's elder granddaughter. Aditya’s best friend  (2022–present)
 Paras Arora as Dr. Veer Dungarpal Singh Malhotra- Dilpreet and Sanjot's adopted son; Amrita and Riya's love interest.(2022–present)
 Pankaj Berry as Dilpreet Singh Brar - Sanjot's husband; Mandeep and Randeep's father; Nimrit and Aastha's father-in law; Amrita and Riya's grandfather; Veer's adoptive father (2022–present)
 Jasjeet Babbar as Sanjot Kaur Brar - Dilpreet's wife; Mandeep and Randeep's mother; Nimrit and Aastha's mother-in law; Amrita and Riya's grandmother; Veer's adoptive mother (2022–present)
 Sandeep Baswana as Dr. Mandeep Singh Brar - Dilpreet and Sanjot's elder son; Randeep's elder brother; Nimrit's brother-in law; Aastha's husband; Amrita's father; Riya's uncle. (2022–present)
 Ravi Gossain as Randeep Singh Brar - Dilpreet and Sanjot's younger son; Mandeep's younger brother; Nimrit's husband; Riya's father; Aastha's brother-in law; Amrita's uncle (2022–present)
 Kanika Maheshwari as Nimrit Randeep Brar - Randeep's wife; Riya's mother; Dilpreet and Sanjot's younger daughter-in law; Mandeep's sister-in law; Amrita's aunt (2022–present)
 Reema Vohra as Dr. Aastha Mandeep Brar - Mandeep's wife; Dilpreet and Sanjot's elder daughter-in-law; Randeep's sister-in-law; Amrita's mother; Riya's aunt. (2022–present)
 Hema Sood as Riya Kaur Brar - Randeep and Nimrit's daughter; Dilpreet and Sanjot's younger granddaughter; Mandeep and Aastha's niece; Amrita's younger cousin sister.(2022–present)

Recurring 
 Jeetendra Bharadwaj as Harneet Singh - Param's husband; Dilpreet's friend (2022-present)
 Piyush as Samar - Veer's friend (2023)
 Abhishek Sharma as Aditya - Amrita's bestfriend (2022–present)
 Vipul Tyagi as Lucky - Veer's bestfriend (2022–present)
 Dolphin Dwivedi as Prajyot - Khushwant's sister; Mandeep's ex-fiance (2022)

Production

Casting 
Initially, Harshad Arora was in talks to play male lead, but later backed out due to his prior commitments.

Kaveri Priyam and Paras Arora were signed as the lead.

Pankaj Berry was cast to portray father opposite Ravi Gossain and Sandeep Baswana.

In December 2022, Abhishek Sharma was cast to portray Aditya.

Development 
The series was announced by Rashmi Sharma Telefilms in September 2022 and was confirmed in October 2022 by Sony SAB.

The series is set in Amritsar, Punjab and  mainly shot at the Film City, Mumbai.

Soundtrack

See also 
 List of programmes broadcast by Sony SAB

References

External links 
 Dil Diyaan Gallaan - Dil Ki Baatein on SonyLIV

2022 Indian television series debuts
2020s Indian television series
Indian drama television series
Hindi-language television shows
Sony SAB original programming